Sedgefield District was, from 1974 to 2009, a local government district and (from 1996), borough in County Durham, in North East England. It had a population of about 87,000 (2001 UK census). It was named after Sedgefield, but its largest town was Newton Aycliffe. Other places included Shildon, Ferryhill and Spennymoor.

The borough was formed (as Sedgefield District), in 1974, under the Local Government Act 1972, by the merger of Sedgefield Rural District, Spennymoor and Shildon urban districts and part of Darlington Rural District.

The borough was abolished as part of the 2009 structural changes to local government in England.

From 1983 to 2007, most of the district was represented in parliament by Tony Blair, who became Leader of the Labour Party in 1994, and Prime Minister in 1997.

Electoral divisions of the district in pre-2009 Durham County Council

Aycliffe East   Aycliffe Village, Neville and Shafto St Mary's parish wards of Great Aycliffe parish
Aycliffe North   Woodham ward; Woodham South parish ward of Great Aycliffe parish
Aycliffe West   West ward; Simpasture parish ward of Great Aycliffe parish
Chilton   Chilton ward; Cornforth parish; Merrington parish ward of Spennymoor parish
Ferryhill   Broom ward; Ferryhill ward
Sedgefield   Sedgefield ward; Bishop Middleham parish
Shildon East   Greenfield Middridge ward; Thickley ward
Shildon West   Byerley ward; Sunnydale ward
Spennymoor and Middlestone   Spennymoor ward; Byers Green and Middlestone parish wards of Spennymoor parish
Trimdon   Fishburn and Old Trimdon ward; New Trimdon and Trimdon Grange ward
Tudhoe   Low Spennymoor and Tudhoe Grange ward; Tudhoe ward

 
English districts abolished in 2009
Former non-metropolitan districts of Durham
Former boroughs in England